Tappeh Taq (also Romanized as Tappeh Ţāq; also known as Pathūk and Pazūk) is a village in Kuh Yakhab Rural District, Dastgerdan District, Tabas County, South Khorasan Province, Iran. At the 2006 census, its population was 392, in 104 families.

References 

Populated places in Tabas County